John Kenneth (Johnny) Miljus (Serbian Cyrillic Џон Кенет Миљуш or Serbian Latin Džon Kenet Miljuš) (June 30, 1895 – February 11, 1976) nicknamed "Big Serb" and "Jovo", was a Serbian-American baseball player who pitched in Major League Baseball between  and . Miljus was most likely the first American Serb to play in professional baseball.

Early life
Miljus was born in the Lawrenceville section of Pittsburgh. He attended Duquesne University and the University of Pittsburgh. While in school, he worked in the steel mills and played college football and baseball. He also played on local semi-pro teams, which occasionally faced Negro league teams like the Homestead Grays. He graduated as a doctor of dentistry but never practiced.

Miljus served in the United States Army during World War I, in France, as part of the 320th Infantry. His wartime bunkmate was Joe Harris. The two of them would later be reunited as members of the Pittsburgh Pirates. Miljus was wounded in action at the Battle of the Argonne and was to be sent home. Instead he chose to rejoin his unit and return to action after leaving the hospital.

Career
After toiling in the minors, this lanky  178-pounder spent six seasons in the major leagues as a pitcher. Miljus reached the majors in 1915 with the Pittsburgh Rebels of the outlaw Federal League, spending one year with them before moving to the Brooklyn Robins (NL, 1920–21), Pittsburgh Pirates (NL, 1927–28) and Cleveland Indians (AL, 1928–29). More than a dependable pitcher, he filled several roles coming out from the bullpen as a closer or a middle reliever, and as an occasional starter as well.

Miljus is probably best remembered as the pitcher who served up a ninth-inning wild pitch that escaped Pirates' catcher Johnny Gooch and allowed the New York Yankees to sweep the 1927 World Series. In Game 4, after striking out Lou Gehrig and Bob Meusel, and with two strikes on Tony Lazzeri, the next Miljus pitch rolled far enough away for Earle Combs to score the winning run.

In a seven-season career, Miljus posted a 29–26 record with 166 strikeouts and a 3.92 ERA in  innings pitched, including 45 starts, 15 complete games, two shutouts, and five saves.

References

External links
Baseball Chronology
Baseball Reference

1895 births
1976 deaths
American people of Serbian descent
Brooklyn Robins players
Cleveland Indians players
Duquesne Dukes baseball players
Pittsburgh Pirates players
Pittsburgh Rebels players
Major League Baseball pitchers
Baseball players from Pennsylvania
St. Marys Saints players
Binghamton Bingoes players
Toledo Mud Hens players
New Orleans Pelicans (baseball) players
Nashville Vols players
Rochester Tribe players
Bridgeport Bears (baseball) players
Seattle Indians players
San Francisco Seals (baseball) players
Hollywood Stars players
Indianapolis Indians players
United States Army personnel of World War I